Md. Abdul Matin Mia is a Jatiya Samajtantrik Dal politician and the former Member of Parliament of Faridpur-2.

Career
Mia was elected to parliament from Faridpur-2 as a Jatiya Samajtantrik Dal candidate in 1979.

References

Jatiya Samajtantrik Dal politicians
Living people
2nd Jatiya Sangsad members
Year of birth missing (living people)